Ener Julio Julio (born 14 October 1973) is a Colombian former professional boxer who competed from 1994 to 2008. He held the WBO junior welterweight title from 2000 to 2002.

Professional career
Julio made his professional debut in 1994. He captured the WBO light welterweight title with a decision victory over Randall Bailey in Miami. He lost the belt in his first defense to DeMarcus Corley after a long period of inactivity in 2002.

References

External links 
 

1973 births
Living people
Colombian male boxers
Light-welterweight boxers
Welterweight boxers
World light-welterweight boxing champions
World Boxing Organization champions
Sportspeople from Cartagena, Colombia
21st-century Colombian people